Cedrus brevifolia, the Cyprus cedar, is a species of conifer in the genus Cedrus. It is native to the Troödos Mountains of central Cyprus. It grows in the Cedar Valley in Pafos State Forest. It is often considered to be a synonym of Cedrus libani (cedar of Lebanon).

References

brevifolia
Cyprus Mediterranean forests
Endemic flora of Cyprus
Endangered plants
Endangered flora of Asia
Endangered biota of Europe
Trees of Western Asia